

Medalists

Standings
Men's Competition

References
Complete 1993 Mediterranean Games Standings Archived

1993 in water polo
Sports at the 1993 Mediterranean Games
1993
1993